Pancalia baldizzonella is a moth in the family Cosmopterigidae. It is found in Italy.

The wingspan is about 15 mm. Adults have been recorded in July.

Taxonomy
Pancalia baldizzonella might be just a form of Pancalia schwarzella.

References

External links
lepiforum.de

Moths described in 1994
Antequerinae
Endemic fauna of Italy
Moths of Europe